FJEP Bonson, is an amateur Korfball club from Bonson, France. The club has dominated French korfball since the 2004/05 season. In the nineties they also won several national titles.

Squad (Current)

Player / Head coach    

Unknown

Honours

 1993/94, 1995/96, 1996/97, 1997/98, 1998/99, 1999/00, 2004/05, 2005/06, 2006/07, 2007/08, 2008/09, 2009/10, 2010/11 - French Champion (13 times)

External links
Bonson website
France Korfball

Korfball teams
Korfball in France